Joe Henderson in Japan is a live album by American saxophonist Joe Henderson, recorded in 1971 at Junk Club in Tokyo, and released on Milestone Records in 1973. Henderson is joined by Japanese musicians Hideo Ichikawa on electric piano, bassist Kunimitsu Inaba and drummer Motohiko Hino.

Reception

Allmusic awarded the album with 4.5 stars and its review by Scott Yanow states: "Performing at the Junk Club in Tokyo, Henderson is joined by an all-Japanese rhythm section on lengthy versions of "'Round Midnight," "Blue Bossa," and his two originals "Out 'n' In" and "Junk Blues." Henderson sounds quite inspired throughout the set, and the obscure rhythm section (only Hino is known in the U.S.) really pushes him. An underrated gem."

Track listing
 "'Round Midnight" (Thelonious Monk) – 12:38 
 "Out 'N' In" (Joe Henderson) – 9:08
 "Blue Bossa" (Kenny Dorham) – 8:29
 "Junk Blues" (Joe Henderson) – 14:46

Personnel
Joe Henderson – tenor saxophone  
Hideo Ichikawa – electric piano  
Kunimitsu Inaba – bass  
Motohiko Hino – drums

References

Joe Henderson live albums
Albums produced by Orrin Keepnews
1971 live albums
Milestone Records live albums